Carmen M. Reyes Bly (born 11 June 1989) is an American-born Puerto Rican retired footballer who has played as a defender. She has been a member of the Puerto Rico women's national team. Once she retired, she became a teacher.

Early and personal life
Reyes was raised in Hayden, Idaho. She was born to a Puerto Rican–American father and a Norwegian–American mother.

International goals
Scores and results list Puerto Rico's goal tally first.

References

1989 births
Living people
Women's association football defenders
Puerto Rican women's footballers
Puerto Rico women's international footballers
Competitors at the 2010 Central American and Caribbean Games
Puerto Rican people of Norwegian descent
American women's soccer players
Soccer players from Idaho
People from Hayden, Idaho
American sportspeople of Puerto Rican descent
American people of Norwegian descent
Montana Lady Griz soccer players